María Castro may refer to:

 María Castro (swimmer) (born 1953), Salvadoran swimmer
 María Castro (actress) (born 1981), Spanish actress
 Maria G. Castro, professor of neurosurgery, and of biology
 Maria Emilia Reis Castro, Portuguese trade union activist